Regis Prograis (born January 24, 1989) is an American professional boxer. He has held the WBC super lightweight title since 2022, and previously the WBA super lightweight title in 2019. As of February 2023, he is ranked as the world's best active super lightweight by the Transnational Boxing Rankings Board, The Ring magazine, and BoxRec.

Prograis chose his nickname, "Rougarou", Louisiana French for 'werewolf', to pay homage to his grandfather, who is of Native American descent.

Amateur career
Prograis is of Louisiana Creole descent and originally from New Orleans. Hurricane Katrina forced him to relocate in 2005 to Houston, Texas, where he began training at Savannah Boxing Club alongside Evander Holyfield which was a key factor in motivating him to take boxing seriously. He went on to build an 87-7 amateur record. As an amateur, Prograis was ranked #4 in the United States, the 2009 Ringside World Champion, 2010 HORN National Champion, won regional Golden Gloves and competed in the 2012 Olympic Trials before turning professional in 2012.

Professional career

Early career
Since turning professional, Prograis has fought at Barclays Center in Brooklyn, New York, on the undercard of the Keith Thurman vs. Shawn Porter fight, which was the first primetime boxing event televised on CBS in over 40 years. In 2015, he was recognized by ESPN as a Prospect of the Year candidate. USA Today and Yahoo Sports has recognized Prograis as a legitimate world title contender. Regis is represented by the boxing promoter Lou DiBella.

WBSS

Prograis vs. Flannagan
On July 13, 2018, it was announced that Prograis would be one of eight boxers taking part in the light welterweight World Boxing Super Series. As the top seeded fighter, he was able to choose the former WBO lightweight champion Terry Flanagan as his first opponent. The opening bout of the tournament took place at the Lakefront Arena in New Orleans, Louisiana on October 27, 2018. Prograis won the fight by unanimous decision, with scores of 117–110, 118–109 and 119–108. He dropped Flannagan with a hook in the eighth round, in what was the sole knockdown of the fight.

Prograis vs. Relikh
Prograis faced the WBA super lightweight champion Kiryl Relikh in the tournament semifinals, which took place at the Cajundome in Lafayette, Louisiana on April 27, 2019. Relikh had earned his place in the penultimate bout of the tournament with a unanimous decision victory over Eduard Troyanovsky in the quarterfinals. Despite being the champion, Relikh entered as a sizable +700 underdog, while most odds-makers had Prograis as a -1000 favorite. He justified his role as the favorite and won the fight by a sixth-round knockout. Prograis had won every single round of the contest up to that point, with all three judges having him up 50–44 at the time of the stoppage.

Prograis vs. Taylor
In the final, which took place on October 26, 2019, at the The O2 Arena in London, England, Prograis faced the IBF and The Ring super lightweight champion Josh Taylor. Predictions before the fight were split, since both fighters had an undefeated professional record and were world champions in their prime. Prograis entered the fight as a slight favorite, with most betting lines having him between -152 and -189, while Taylor was listed as a between +130 to a +140 underdog. Taylor won the fight by majority decision. Two judges ultimately scored it 117–112 and 115–113 in favor of the Scottsman, while the sole remaining judge had it scored as a 114-114 draw.

WBC light welterweight champion

Second title run
Prograis faced the unbeaten Juan Heraldez on October 31, 2020, on the undercard of the Gervonta Davis and Leo Santa Cruz Showtime pay-per-view. He won the fight by a third-round technical knockout. Prograis dropped his opponent with a straight left early in the final round of the bout and finished him with a flurry of punches at the 1:23 minute mark. Prograis faced Ivan Redkach on the undercard of Jake Paul vs. Ben Askren on April 17, 2021. The fight was stopped in the sixth round, due to an accidental low blow that rendered Redkach unable to continue competing. Prograis won by technical decision, with two scorecards of 60–54 and one scorecard of 59–54. The results was immediately overturned however, as Georgia regulations state that a boxer who is unable to continue after being hit with an unintentional low blow shall be declared the loser by a technical knockout. His third and final non-title bout, before making his second attempt at a world title, took place on March 19, 2022, against Tyrone McKenna. Prograis won the fight by a sixth-round technical knockout.

Prograis vs. Zepeda
On July 22, 2022, the  WBC light welterweight mandatory title challenger Jose Ramirez was ordered to face the sanctioning body's second ranked contender Jose Zepeda for the vacant championship. Ramirez withdrew from the negotiations on August 1, because of a conflict with his wedding in October, and was replaced by Prograis. As they failed to reach an agreement within the 30-day negotiation period, a purse bid was called, which was won by the recently formed promotional company MarvNation with a bid of $2,4 million. The vacant title bout took place at the Dignity Health Sports Park in Carson, California and was broadcast as a pay-per-view. Prograis won the fight by an eleventh-round knockout. He was up 98–92, 98–92 and 97–93 at the time of the stoppage. The newly crowned champion had out-landed Zepeda 156 to 66 in total punches and 75 to 31 in power punches. Both fighters earned a guaranteed $1,080,000, with Prograis earning an additional $240,000 bonus.

Professional boxing record

See also
List of world light-welterweight boxing champions

References

External links

 

|-

|-

|-

1989 births
Living people
American male boxers
Boxers from Louisiana
Sportspeople from New Orleans
Louisiana Creole people
World light-welterweight boxing champions
Southpaw boxers
World Boxing Association champions
World Boxing Council champions
African-American boxers